Mads Bødker (born August 31, 1987) is a retired Danish professional ice hockey defenceman who lastly played for SønderjyskE of the Danish Metal Ligaen. He has played three seasons with Rødovre Mighty Bulls of the Danish top league AL-Bank Ligaen, as well as participated in seven Ice Hockey World Championships as a member of the Denmark men's national ice hockey team. He is the older brother of HC Lugano winger Mikkel Bødker.

References

External links
 

1987 births
Living people
Danish ice hockey defencemen
Rødovre Mighty Bulls players
Rögle BK players
Sportspeople from Copenhagen